Macon Township is a civil township of Lenawee County in the U.S. state of Michigan.  As of the 2000 census, the township population was 1,448.

Geography

Demographics
As of the census of 2000, there were 1,448 people, 502 households, and 415 families residing in the township. There were 516 housing units at an average density of 15.8 per square mile (6.1/km2). The racial makeup of the township was 96.75% White, 0.21% African American, 0.62% Native American, 0.07% Pacific Islander, 0.55% from other races, and 1.80% from two or more races. Hispanic or Latino of any race were 1.52% of the population.

There were 502 households, out of which 36.9% had children under the age of 18 living with them, 73.9% were married couples living together, 6.4% had a female householder with no husband present, and 17.3% were non-families. 14.1% of all households were made up of individuals, and 5.4% had someone living alone who was 65 years of age or older. The average household size was 2.88 and the average family size was 3.17.

In the township the population was spread out, with 27.0% under the age of 18, 6.6% from 18 to 24, 28.6% from 25 to 44, 27.3% from 45 to 64, and 10.6% who were 65 years of age or older. The median age was 38 years. For every 100 females, there were 105.4 males. For every 100 females age 18 and over, there were 106.0 males.

The median income for a household in the township was $61,818, and the median income for a family was $65,938. Males had a median income of $42,171 versus $29,653 for females. The per capita income for the township was $24,059. About 0.2% of families and 1.6% of the population were below the poverty line, including 1.1% of those under age 18 and none of those age 65 or over.

Notable people
Frank T. Tucker, Wisconsin State Assemblyman and lawyer, was born in the township.

Gallery

References

External links
Lenawee County government site

Townships in Lenawee County, Michigan
Townships in Michigan
1834 establishments in Michigan Territory
Populated places established in 1834